Arenimonas daechungensis is a Gram-negative, non-spore-forming, rod-shaped and non-motile bacterium from the genus of Arenimonas which has been isolated from sediments from the Daechung reservoir in Korea.

References

Xanthomonadales
Bacteria described in 2013